Adam's Engineering College is an Engineering College located at Sitarampatnam, a suburb of Paloncha, Khammam District, in India. It was founded in the year 1998. The Chairman of the college is Mr. Potla Nageswar Rao. The college offers programs at undergraduate level. It is affiliated to Jawaharlal Nehru Technological University.

External links 
 Adam's Engineering CollegeOfficial Website

Universities and colleges in Telangana
All India Council for Technical Education
Educational institutions established in 1998
1998 establishments in Andhra Pradesh